The Nepal Workers Peasants Party (NWPP), also known as the Nepal Workers' and Peasants' Party and the Nepal Majdoor Kisan Party (abbr.), is a communist political party in Nepal. The party was founded on 23 January 1975 by Narayan Man Bijukchhe and draws most of its support from Bhaktapur. The party is sympathetic to the Workers' Party of Korea and has declared Juche to be a "directional ideology".

History

Foundation and early years (1975–1981) 
The Nepal Workers' and Peasants' Party was founded as the Nepal Workers and Peasants Organization (NPWO) in Nepal on 23 January 1975. The NPWO broke away from the Communist Party of Nepal (Pushpa Lal) in protest over Pushpa Lal Shrestha's support for Indian intervention in East Pakistan, together with the Proletarian Revolutionary Organisation, Nepal, and the Mazdoor Kisan Sangram Samiti. In 1981, the NWPO split, and two separate parties came into existence. One party was led by Narayan Man Bijukchhe, which later became the Nepal Workers' and Peasants' Party and the other was led by Hareram Sharma.

Jana Andholan I and II (1990–2007) 

Bijukchhe's NWPO formed part of the United Left Front and took part in the 1990 Jana Andolan uprising. It participated in the formation of the Samyukta Janamorcha Nepal but left shortly before the 1991 election. The group changed its name to the Nepal Workers Peasants Party and contested the election separately. It fielded 30 candidates, out of whom two were elected. The party received a total of 91,335 votes, or 1.25%.

Ahead of the 1992 elections to local bodies, the NWPP formed an electoral coalition with the Samyukta Janamorcha Nepal, Communist Party of Nepal (Marxist-Leninist-Maoist), Communist Party of Nepal (Marxist), and Nepal Communist League.

NWPP was active in the protest movements against repression in Nepal and is a member of the Seven Party Alliance which spearheaded the 2006 Loktantra Andolan. After the restoration of a democratic system, the party decided not to join the government, but stayed in the Seven Party Alliance, which later converted into the Eight Party Alliance. When the interim legislature was formed in January 2007, Bijukchhe was joined by three other nominated MPs.

Constituent Assembly and Federal Nepal (2008–present) 
The party contested the 2008 Constituent Assembly elections and won four seats to the Constituent Assembly. The party also had one nominated member. In the 2013 Constituent Assembly elections, the party again won four seats. The party voted for Khadga Prasad Oli in the prime minister election on 12 October 2015.

In the 2017 local elections, the party won 99 seats across local governments and won one mayoral position, with Sunil Prajapati being elected as the mayor of Bhaktapur Municipality. The party also contested the 2017 legislative and provincial elections, winning one seat in the House of Representatives and two seats to the Provincial Assembly of Province No. 3.

Ideology 

The Nepal Workers Peasants Party is a communist party, with the party taking major inspiration from the Chinese Mao Zedong Thought ideology. The guiding economic principle of the party is scientific socialism.

In recent years, the party has incorporated the Juche idea as a guiding principle. After visiting North Korea, party leader Narayan Man Bijukchhe has attempted to implement the governing policies of Juche into the city of Bhaktapur. Portraits of the Kim family can be found at the party headquarters in Bhaktapur. The party sees political independence and economic self-sufficiency as the cornerstones of development. The party also sees India as an imperialist force working against Nepalese interests.

List of Members of Parliament 

List of Pratinidhi Sabha members from Nepal Majdoor Kishan Party

Electoral performance

Legislative elections

Provincial elections

Bagmati

References 

Communist parties in Nepal
Juche political parties
1975 establishments in Nepal
Political parties established in 1975